Gangsta is a 2018 Belgian crime film co-edited, co-written and directed by Adil El Arbi and Bilall Fallah. Main roles are played by Matteo Simoni, Nora Gharib, Saïd Boumazoughe, Gene Bervoets and Axel Daeseleire.

Synopsis
Adamo is a young man living in Antwerp. His roots are Moroccan-Italian. He and his friends deal soft drugs. Their cover is the pizzeria of their uncle Farid. They then plan to concentrate on selling hard drugs. They agree with drug lord Orlando Marie to pick up a shipment of cocaine smuggled via the port of Antwerp. When they are almost caught by two policemen, they are forced to dump the cocaine in the river Scheldt.

Adamo retrieves part of the cocaine and starts selling it. The two policemen also find part of the drugs and set up a drugs swindle. Orlando starts a manhunt to retrieve his money.

Cast
 Matteo Simoni as Adamo
 Nora Gharib as Badia
 Saïd Boumazoughe as Volt
 Junes Lazaar as Junes
 Nabil Mallat as Yasser
 Paloma Aguilera Valdebenito as El Toro
 Gene Bervoets as investigative judge
 Axel Daeseleire as Stijn
 Jeroen Perceval as Geert
 Stefan Perceval as Rudy
 Vic De Wachter as chief officer
 Ali B as Hassan Kamikaze
 Werner Kolf as Orlando Marie
 Noureddine Farihi as uncle Farid
 François Beukelaers as priest
 Eric Corton as Mathijs Steensma
 Aza Declercq as Maria
 Hef Frans as Hef
 Bond Mgebrishvili as Bodyguard Orlando Marie
 Ludwig Hendrickx as Bodyguard Orlando Marie
 Hans Royaards as Politician

References

External links

2018 films
2018 crime films
Hood films
Belgian crime films
2010s Dutch-language films
Films directed by Adil El Arbi and Bilall Fallah
Films about organized crime in Belgium
Dutch-language Belgian films